

Squad

Competitions

Major League Soccer

U.S. Open Cup

MLS Cup Playoffs

Squad statistics

Final Statistics

References

Sporting Kansas City seasons
Kansas City Wizards
Kansas City Wizards
Kansas City Wizards